Events from the year 1423 in France

Incumbents
 Monarch – Charles VII

Events

Births

3 July – Louis XI of France (died 1483)

Deaths

Full date missing
Margaret of Bavaria (born 1363)
Jean Courtecuisse, bishop (born c.1350)

See also

References

1420s in France